Amoroso may refer to:

Music 
 Amoroso (album), an album released in 1976
 Rondo amoroso, Op. 14, No. 7, a piano piece written by Harald Sæverud

People 
 Amoroso (surname)

Other uses 
 Amoroso's Baking Company, a Philadelphia-based bakery
 Amoroso distribution, a generalized variant of the generalized gamma distribution
 Renato Amoroso, a character in Malèna
 A Spanish word for a sweetened oloroso sherry
 The German name for the Pokémon Omastar

See also
 Amorosi (disambiguation)
 Amoruso, a surname